Microwave is an American rock band from Atlanta, Georgia. They have supported bands such as The Wonder Years, letlive., Have Mercy, Man Overboard, Tiny Moving Parts, Motion City Soundtrack, Jimmy Eat World, Can't Swim, The Dangerous Summer, and Boston Manor. They are currently signed to Pure Noise Records.

History

2012-2013: Formation and early releases
Microwave formed in Woodstock, Georgia in 2012. The group released their first and second EPs, Nowhere Feels Like Home and Swine Driver, on January 10 and March 30, 2013. Their third EP When the Fever Breaks was released on September 17, 2013.

2014-2018: Stovall and Much Love
Microwave released their first full-length album Stovall on August 23, 2014. They released their second full-length album Much Love on September 30, 2016.

2019-Present: Death is a Warm Blanket
Their third full-length-album  Death is a Warm Blanket  was released September 13th 2019, via Pure Noise Records. Loudwire named it one of the 50 best rock albums of 2019.

On July 5, 2022, the band released "Someday I Suppose/Santeria", a split promotional single with Drug Church, which included the band’s cover of "Santeria" by Sublime. Both songs appeared on the compilation album Dead Formats, Vol. 1 from Pure Noise Records, which was released on August 29, 2022.

Discography 
Studio albums
 Stovall (2014)
 Much Love (2016)
 Death Is a Warm Blanket (2019)

EPs
 Nowhere Feels Like Home (2013)
 Swine Driver (2013)
 When the Fever Breaks (2013)
 Split w/ Head North (2015)
 keeping up (2018)

Singles
 "Carry" (2019)
 "DIAWB" (2019)
 "Float to the Top" (2019)
 "Circling the Drain" (2022)
 "Straw Hat" (2022)
 "Ferrari" (2023)

Other appearances
 "Someday I Suppose/Santeria" (Promotional single with Drug Church.) (2022)

Members 
Current members

Nathan Hardy - Lead Vocals, Guitar (2012-Present)

Tyler Hill - Bass, Backing Vocals (2012-Present)

Travis Hill - Guitar, Backing Vocals (2016-Present)

Timothy "Tito" Pittard - Drums (2012-Present)

Past Members

Wesley Swanson - Guitar, Backing Vocals (2012-2016)

References 

Musical groups from Atlanta
SideOneDummy Records artists